Mongolian Wrestling Federation (MWF), is the governing body of Olympic wrestling in Mongolia.
The Mongolian Wrestling Federation (MWF) was created in 1961 and in the same year was admitted to UWW.
MWF is now based in Ulaanbaatar, Mongolia.

Wrestling olympic medal winners from Mongolia 
1968 Summer Olympics
Jigjidiin Mönkhbat-silver medal
Chimedbazaryn Damdinsharav-bronze medal
Danzandarjaagiin Sereeter-bronze
1972 Summer Olympics
Khorloogiin Bayanmönkh-silver medal
1976 Summer Olympics
Zevegiin Oidov-silver medal
1980 Summer Olympics
J.Davaajav-silver medal
Dugarsürengiin Oyuunbold-bronze medal
2012 Summer Olympics
Soronzonboldyn Battsetseg-bronze medal

References

External links

Sports organizations established in 1961
1961 establishments in Mongolia
1961 in professional wrestling
National members of the Asian Council of Associated Wrestling
Wrestling